Sir Arthur Alfred Clement Cocks,  (27 May 1862 – 25 April 1943) was an Australian politician, elected as a member of the New South Wales Legislative Assembly.

Early life
Cocks was born at Wild Duck Creek, near Heathcote, Victoria and educated at a state school at Richmond before entering retailing at 14.  He married Elizabeth Agnes Gibb in 1884 and they had a son and a daughter.  He established a business of wholesale jewellers and opticians, Arthur Cocks & Co.  He was a member of the Sydney Municipal Council from 1906 to 1914 and was Lord Mayor of Sydney in 1913 and was in 1920 involved in the foundation of the Civic Reform Association.

Political career
Cocks represented St Leonards from 1910 to 1920 and North Shore from 1920 to 1925, initially for the Liberal Reform Party and then the Nationalist Party.  He was Colonial Treasurer from 1922 to 1925 in the Fuller ministry.

Cocks died at Mosman, New South Wales. His wife and children predeceased him.

Honours
Cocks was appointed a Knight Commander of the Order of the British Empire (KBE) in 1925.

References

 

Members of the New South Wales Legislative Assembly
Commonwealth Liberal Party politicians
Civic Reform Association politicians
Australian Knights Commander of the Order of the British Empire
Australian politicians awarded knighthoods
1862 births
1943 deaths
Treasurers of New South Wales
Agents-General for New South Wales